Rosensgade 38 is a house and a listed building in Aarhus, Denmark. The house was built in approximately 1600 and was listed on the Danish registry of protected buildings and places by the Danish Heritage Agency on 21 March 2012. The building is situated in the historic Latin Quarter neighborhood on Pustervig square in the city center.

References

External links 
 

Listed buildings in Aarhus
Houses completed in 1600